2010 in Korea may refer to:
2010 in North Korea
2010 in South Korea